Butterfly Equity is an American private equity company based in Beverly Hills, California. Butterfly specializes in food investments, and is the owner of Qdoba, Bolthouse Farms, and Chosen Foods.

References